= Ranunculus plebeius =

Scientific classification
- Kingdom: Plantae
- Clade: Tracheophytes
- Clade: Angiosperms
- Clade: Eudicots
- Order: Ranunculales
- Family: Ranunculaceae
- Genus: Ranunculus
- Species: R. plebeius

Binomial name
- Ranunculus plebeius R.Br. ex DC.

Species of plant

Ranunculus plebeius is a species of plant in the family Ranunculaceae.
